Dušan Marković (born 3 April 1998) is a Serbian football goalkeeper who plays for a Montenegrin team Dečić.

Career

Club
On 4 February 2021, Sheriff Tiraspol announced the signing of Marković.

References

External links
 
 

1998 births
Living people
Association football goalkeepers
Serbian footballers
FK Rad players
FC Sheriff Tiraspol players
Serbian SuperLiga players
Moldovan Super Liga players
Serbia under-21 international footballers
Serbian expatriate footballers
Expatriate footballers in Moldova
Serbian expatriate sportspeople in Moldova
People from Smederevska Palanka